Cophanta is a genus of moths of the family Noctuidae.

Species
 Cophanta funestalis Walker, 1864
 Cophanta occidentalis Hampson, 1910

References

 Cophanta at Markku Savela's Lepidoptera and Some Other Life Forms
 Natural History Museum Lepidoptera genus database

Acontiinae